Fred A. Birchmore (1911–2012) was a renowned adventurer from Athens, Georgia, best known for his 1935 travels around the world on a bicycle. His Reinhardt bicycle, which he named 'Bucephalus', is in the collections of the Smithsonian Institution's National Museum of American History. Fred was also notable in Athens for being the head of Athens Realty Company for thirty years and for hand-building a massive stone wall, over 2 meters tall in places, when he was in his 70s, and walking down the steps of the Washington Monument on his hands. Fred had many pursuits and careers including lawyer, college professor, International Exchange Scholar, author, lecturer, free lance writer for National Geographic, Atlanta Journal, Ripley's "Believe-It-Or-Not", boxer, acrobat, deck hand, seaman, ship fitter, selective service advisor, Naval Gunnery officer WWII, boxing coach, aviator, archaeologist, ornithologist, Boy and Girl Scout Leader, singer, President of Athens Kiwanis Club, tennis coach, organic farmer, and youth camp director.

Later life exploits 
Age 61: Bicycled 4,500 miles through ten countries in Europe.

Age 63: Hike the 2,000-mile Appalachian Trail in the United States.

Age 64: Floated the Suwanee River from Okefenokee Swamp across South Georgia and North Florida thru Hurricane Agnes to the Gulf of Mexico.

Age 65: Walking tour of Great Britain.

Age 66: Hiked (alone) the Inca Trail in Peru.

Age 67: Hiked the Long Trail thru Green Mountains in Vermont to Canada.

Age 68: Hiked the Inca Trail (second time). Completed a 10,000 mile tour of China.

Age 69: Bicycled the Skyline Drive from Rockfish Gap to Front Royal, Virginia.

Age 70: Bicycled the Milford Track in New Zealand.

Age 73: Balloon trip to Switzerland.

Age 76: Completed his hand built stone wall at his residence in Athens, Georgia and a world tour.

Age 77: Hiked the Denali wilderness in Alaska.

Age 80: Traveled to China and camped in Nova Scotia, Newfoundland, and hiked Mount Katahdin.

References

1911 births
2012 deaths
People from Athens, Georgia
American centenarians
Men centenarians